Callimetopus tagalus is a species of beetle in the family Cerambycidae. It was described by Heller in 1899, originally under the genus Euclea. It is known from the Philippines.

Varietas
 Callimetopus tagalus var. rufofasciatus (Schultze, 1919)
 Callimetopus tagalus var. tricolor (Heller, 1921)

References

Callimetopus
Beetles described in 1899